Peter Corke  (born 24 August 1959) is an Australian roboticist known for his work on Visual Servoing, field robotics, online education, the online Robot Academy and the Robotics Toolbox and Machine Vision Toolbox for MATLAB (matrix laboratory). He is currently director of the Australian Research Council Centre of Excellence for Robotic Vision, and a Distinguished Professor of Robotic Vision at Queensland University of Technology. His research is concerned with robotic vision, flying robots and farming robots.

Corke is a Fellow of the Australian Academy of Technological Sciences and Engineering and of the Institute of Electrical and Electronics Engineers.  He is a founding editor of the Journal of Field Robotics, and a former member of the executive editorial board of The International Journal of Robotics Research.

Career 
Corke received Bachelor of Engineering, Masters of Engineering and Ph.D. degrees from the University of Melbourne in Australia.

In 1984 he worked at CSIRO, formerly the Commonwealth Scientific and Industrial Research Organisation, on robotics. He developed an open-source robot control system and vision applications in food processing and for real-time traffic monitoring.

In 1995 he moved to Brisbane and established a program of research into mining automation focused on Dragline excavators, rope shovels and load-haul-dump (load-haul-dump) units. In 1996, Corke co-authored an early tutorial paper and later proposed the partitioned approach to visual control. He served as Research Director of the Autonomous Systems Laboratory of CSIRO's Information and Communications Technology Centre (ICTC), from 2004 to 2007.

From 2005 to 2009 he worked on wireless sensor network technology, was a co-developer of the Fleck wireless sensor node, and investigated applications to environmental monitoring and agriculture, and virtual fencing. He was a senior principal research scientist when he left to take up a chair  at the Queensland University of Technology in 2010.

From 2009 to 2013, he served as editor-in-chief of the IEEE's Robotics & Automation magazine.

Works

External links 
 Peter Corke's personal website
 QUT Robot Academy
 Australian Research Council Centre of Excellence for Robotic Vision
 QUT CyPhy lab home page
 Publications on Google Scholar
 Publications on DBLP

References 

Australian roboticists
Fellow Members of the IEEE
Academic staff of Queensland University of Technology
1959 births
University of Melbourne alumni
Fellows of the Australian Academy of Technological Sciences and Engineering
Living people